The Fund for Defense of Net Neutrality (French: Fonds de Défense de la Net Neutralité  or FDN²) is a French-based non-profit organization that collects funds and donations for movements that promote free speech on the internet. The organization was founded in 2008, in response to the need to fund La Quadrature du Net.

WikiLeaks involvement
FDN² gained world-wide attention in July 2012 after it agreed to collect donations for WikiLeaks that had been blocked by US-based financial organizations despite the absence of any legal proceedings. FDN² indicated that it would channel donations through its "Carte Bleue" venue;  according to Wikileaks Visa and Mastercharge are contractually bound to work with Carte Bleue.

References

External links
Official web site

Non-profit organizations based in France